Méral is a commune in the Mayenne department in north-western France.

Geography
The Oudon River forms part of the commune's north-eastern border.

See also
Communes of Mayenne

References

External links

 Official Website

Communes of Mayenne